Ivanpah (Chemehuevi: "Clean Water") is in the Mojave National Preserve in San Bernardino County, California. There are several residences in the area, but no real village.

Ivanpah is located on the bajada below the northeast side of the New York Mountains overlooking the broad Ivanpah Valley. The Ivanpah Mountains lie across the valley to the northwest.

Ivanpah is located at the crossing of Ivanpah Road and the Union Pacific Railroad, which was the Los Angeles and Salt Lake Railroad until 1921 when it was bought out by Union Pacific. There was once a general store located here.

Ivanpah is also the home of the Ivanpah Solar Power Facility, the largest thermal solar power facility in the world, which opened officially on February 13, 2014.

References 

Unincorporated communities in San Bernardino County, California
Populated places in the Mojave Desert
Unincorporated communities in California